The 1925 William & Mary Indians football team was an American football team that represented the College of William & Mary as an independent during the 1925 college football season. In its third season under head coach J. Wilder Tasker, William & Mary compiled a 7–4 record and outscored opponents by a total of 235 to 86.

Schedule

References

William and Mary
William & Mary Tribe football seasons
William